News Central is the Philippine English-language primetime newscast television program that aired on Studio 23 from September 21, 1998 to October 1, 2010, replacing News 23 and was replaced by Iba-Balita. The program featured a focus on major stories from around the country.

Anchors
Mari Kaimo (1998–2007)
Cher Calvin (1998–2003)
Ria Tanjuatco-Trillo (2003–2010)
Chinggay Andrada (showbiz anchor) (2003–2006)
TJ Manotoc (2007–2010)
Tricia Chiongbian (showbiz anchor) (2006–2010)

Awards
Best News Program: KBP Golden Dove Awards (2002 and 2006)
Best Newscaster, Mari Kaimo: KBP Golden Dove Awards (2006)

See also
 List of Philippine television shows
 List of programs aired by Studio 23

References

1998 Philippine television series debuts
2010 Philippine television series endings
1990s Philippine television series
2000s Philippine television series
Studio 23 news shows
Studio 23 original programming
English-language television shows